María del Rosario González (born 9 April 1967), known as Lalo Barrubia, is a Uruguayan writer, performer, and translator based in Malmö, Sweden.

Career
Lalo Barrubia has published eight books of poetry, several novels, and short story collections. Her texts appear in the anthologies Zur-dos: última poesía latinoamericana (Paradiso, Argentina, 2004) and Porque el país no alcanza: poesía emigrante de la América Latina (EBL, Mexico, 2011), among others. In 2014 she was awarded the National Literature Prize of Uruguay in the Narrative category (published works) for the book Ratas (originally published by Criatura in 2012).

In 2011 she published her first book of poems in bilingual edition in Sweden, Borracha en las ciudades, with translation by Juana Adcock. In 2015 she worked on the project 100 KAVD (100 short and angry everyday poems / Copenhagen – Helsinki) that brings together poetry and performance. She is the editor of the translated poetry series La Piedra Imán (Ediciones Liliputienses, Spain) and teaches poetry and prose workshops.

She has also worked as a cultural producer and project manager for several public and private institutions, including Kulturförvaltningen i Malmö.

In 2020 her short story "L'angelito" was published in translation in Italian literary magazine L'ircocervo.

Works
 Suzuki 400 (poetry, 1989 / 2nd ed. 2017)
 Tabaco (poetry, 1999)
 Arena (novel, 2004 / 2nd ed. 2017)
 Pegame que me gusta (novel, 2009 / 2nd ed. 2014)
 Borracha en las ciudades (poetry, 2011 / 2nd ed. 2013 / 3rd ed. 2016)
 Ratas (tales, 2012)
 Los misterios dolorosos (novel, 2013)

Performances
 La puta madre, 1991
 El Rap de la Pocha, 1999-2000
 Latino for ever (Montevideo – Maldonado – Berlín – Helsinki) 2007–2008
 Parásitos (Malmö – Lund – Helsinki) 2008-2011
 Fronteras/Borderline (Gothenburg – Mexico City – Montevideo) 2013–2014
 100 KAVD (Copenhagen – Helsinki), 2015

Awards
 Award of the Ministry of Education and Culture of Uruguay (2011) – 3rd Prize in the Narrative category
 Annual Literature Awards (2014) – 1st Prize in the Narrative category (published work: Ratas, 2012)

References

External links
 

1967 births
20th-century Uruguayan poets
20th-century Uruguayan women writers
21st-century Uruguayan poets
21st-century Uruguayan women writers
Living people
Uruguayan expatriates in Sweden
Uruguayan novelists
Uruguayan translators
Uruguayan women novelists
Uruguayan women poets
Uruguayan women short story writers
Uruguayan short story writers
Writers from Montevideo